WKOV-FM (96.7 MHz) is a radio station broadcasting an adult contemporary format.  Licensed to Oak Hill, Ohio, United States, it serves the Jackson, Ohio area.  The station is currently owned by Jackson County Broadcasting. The station formerly carried a hot adult contemporary format as "Star 96.7", later "Mix 96.7".

Previous logo

References

External links

WKOV Mix 96.7 FM on Facebook

Jackson County, Ohio
KOV-FM